Piya Ka Ghar Pyaara Lage is an Indian television series that was broadcast on Sahara One . The series ran from 10 November 2011 to 27 September 2013.

Plot
The series revolves around Sejal  (Sanjeeda Sheikh)  who struggles with husband  Bittu  (Giriraj Kabra / Raj Singh).

Cast
 Sanjeeda Sheikh as Sejal Mehta
 Giriraj Kabra / Raj Singh as Bittu 
 Leena Jumani as Piya Nanavati
 Neelu Kohli  as Rano Mehta
 Govind Khatri as Harbans Lal Mehta
 Abhay Harpade as Naveen Nanavati (Piya Father)
 Reshmi Ghosh / Bharti Sharma as Urmila
 Mugdha Shah as  Sejal Mother
 Aditi Sajwan  /  Shalini Sahuta as Roop
 Khusboo Kamal as Pinky Malhotra
 Shivani Gosain as Banto Malhotra
 Amit Pachori   as Angad (Urmila's husband)
 Bharat Chawda as Pappu (Bittu's cousin)
 Pawan Tiwari  as Prakash (Bittu's friend)
 Usha Bachani as Mrs. Nanavati
  Simmy Solanki as Ms. Nanavati  (Piya Sister)
  Prakash Ramchandani as Advocate

References

Indian television soap operas
Indian comedy television series
Sahara One original programming
2011 Indian television series debuts
2013 Indian television series endings